Ghassan J. Hage (born 1957 in Beirut, Lebanon) is a Lebanese-Australian academic serving as Future Generation Professor of Anthropology at the University of Melbourne, Australia. He has held a number of visiting professorships including at the American University of Beirut, University of Nanterre – Paris X, the University of Copenhagen and Harvard. He is currently (2022-2023) a visiting professor at the Max Planck Institute of Social Anthropology in Halle (Germany).

Biography
Hage grew up in Beirut, Lebanon, as part of a Maronite Catholic family. He moved to Sydney in 1976, aged 19. Hage's maternal grandparents, are of Lebanese background, but had migrated to Australia from Santo Domingo in the 1930s. His mother, born in Santo Domingo, was an Australian citizen and thirty years old when she went to Lebanon and married Hage's father, Lt Colonel Hamid Hage. After their marriage they lived in Baabda, near Beirut, where Hage was born. Hage completed his schooling in Lebanon. He obtains his Baccalaureat 2eme Partie as a student of the International College (section française). Hage had enrolled at the American University of Beirut as a pre-med student when the Lebanese civil war (1975-1990) erupted. He left Lebanon in 1976 and joined the maternal side of the family in Australia. Hage completed a Bachelor of Arts (Hons) at Macquarie University in 1982, a Diplome de 3eme Cycle (Universite de Nice, 1983) and a PhD in anthropology (a study of communal identification among Christian Lebanese during the Lebanese civil war - Macquarie University, 1989). From 1987-88 he was a part-time lecturer at UTS, then until 1994 a lecturer in Social Sciences at the University of Western Sydney. He was at the University of Sydney from 1994-2008 before moving to the University of Melbourne. He has also held a post-doctoral research position and a visiting professorship at Pierre Bourdieu’s research centre in Paris at the Ecole des Hautes Etudes en Sciences Sociales which has been of particular importance in his intellectual formation.

He divides his time between Melbourne, Sydney, Beirut and Europe, and is fluent in French, Arabic and English.

He is deaf, possibly due to a bomb explosion in Beirut in his teenage years. His hearing declined considerably in the 1980s and 1990s. He has had one cochlear implant fitted in 2004 and another in 2012.

Contributions
Hage works on the comparative anthropology of racism, nationalism and multiculturalism, particularly in Australia and the Middle East. He has written and conducted fieldwork on the Lebanese transnational diaspora in Australia, the US, Europe, Canada and Venezuela. He also researches and writes in social theory, particularly the work of Pierre Bourdieu.

He has been a high-profile contributor to debates on multiculturalism in Australia and has published widely on the topic. His most influential work is White Nation, which draws on theory from Whiteness studies, Jacques Lacan and Pierre Bourdieu to interpret ethnographic work undertaken in Australia. The book has been widely debated in Australia, with many of its themes picked up by anti-racism activists in other countries.  The follow-up Against Paranoid Nationalism is an analysis of certain themes in Australian politics that became prominent under the government of John Howard.

He has also written on the political dimensions of critical anthropology (His work in this area appears in the volume Alter-Politics: Critical Thought and the Radical Imagination (Melbourne University Press 2015)). His recent writings include: Is Racism an Environmental Threat? which is an invitation to see racial/colonial domination and the domination of nature as off shoots of the same mode of inhabiting the earth. What Hage refers to as 'domestication': a mode of feeling at home in the world by dominating it. Decay, an edited volume that highlights the importance of including the permant processes of decomposition and disintegration that is part of all existing forms. 

Hage's most recent book: The Diasporic Condition: Ethnographic Explorations of the Lebanese in the World, is seen as his most important contribution to anthropology as a discipline. The book is concerned with affirming the importance of a continuity between classical anthropological questions and the study of diasporic culture. It also highlights the critical anthropological task of expanding our knowledge of the plurality of modes of existing in the world.

Honours
Fellow of the Australian Academy of the Social Sciences
Fellow of the Australian Academy of the Humanities
Fellow of the British Academy of the Social Sciences
Past President of the Australian Anthropological Society
2004 winner, Community Relations Commission Award, New South Wales Premier's Literary Awards, for Against Paranoid nationalism.

Selected publications
 Hage, G. (2021), The Diasporic Condition: Ethnographic Explorations of the Lebanese in the World. Chicago: University of Chicago Press
 Hage, G. (ed.)(2021), Decay. New York and London: Duke University Press
 Hage, G. (2021), L'Alterpolitique: anthropologie critique et imaginaire radical. Toulouse: EuroPhilosophie Éditions
 Hage, G. (2017), Is Racism an Environmental Threat?. Cambridge: Polity Press
 Hage, G. (2017). Le Loup et le Musulman. Paris: Wildproject.
 Hage, G. (2015), Alter-Politics: Critical anthropology and the Radical Imagination. Carlton: Melbourne University Press.
 Hage, G. and R. Eckersley (eds.) 2012. Responsibility. Carlton South, Vic. : Melbourne University Press.
 Hage, G. and E. Kowal (eds.) (2011) Force, Movement, Intensity: The Newtonian Imagination in the Social Sciences, Carlton South, Vic.: Melbourne University Press
 Hage, G  (2009) Waiting. Carlton South, Vic. : Melbourne University Press
 Hage, G., Worpole K, and Scruton R. (2004). What Would You Die For?. The British Council.
 Hage, G (2003) Against Paranoid Nationalism: searching for hope in a shrinking society, Annandale, NSW: Pluto Press
 Hage, G (Ed)(2002) Arab-Australians today : citizenship and belonging, Carlton: Melbourne University Press
 Hage, G (2000) White Nation: fantasies of White supremacy in a multicultural society, New York: Routledge
 Hage, G and Couch, R (Eds)(1999) The future of Australian multiculturalism : reflections on the twentieth anniversary of Jean Martin's The Migrant Presence, Sydney, N.S.W. : Research Institute for Humanities and Social Sciences, University of Sydney
 Hage, G, with Grace, H, Johnson, L, Langworth, J, and Symonds, M. (1997) Home/World: Space, community and marginality in Sydney's west, Annandale: Pluto Press.

References

 
 Racism is not simply black and white, opinion, Sydney Morning Herald, 12/6/06
 Stevenson, A 'Open eyes to ethnic crime', Sydney Morning Herald, 13/7/06
 Podcast

External links
 http://www.usyd.edu.au/podcasts/2006/keyconcepts5.mp3
 http://qtlisten.lecture.unimelb.edu.au/download-media/Sem074/0807301755Sem07412300056282059.mp3 
 http://mpegmedia.abc.net.au/rn/podcast/2009/03/tsy_20090314_1405.mp3
 Ghassan Hage SBS World View hosted on SoundCloud

1957 births
Australian people of Lebanese descent
Australian non-fiction writers
Australian anthropologists
Academic staff of the University of Sydney
Academic staff of the University of Melbourne
Living people
Lebanese Maronites